Semyon Olegovich Sinyavskiy (born 30 September 1993) is a Russian football forward.

Club career
He made his debut in the Russian Second Division for FC Lokomotiv-2 Moscow on 23 July 2012 in a game against FC Znamya Truda Orekhovo-Zuyevo.

He made his Russian Football National League debut for FC Armavir on 17 July 2018 in a game against FC SKA-Khabarovsk.

On 1 July 2019, he signed a contract with Armenian club FC Banants.

References

External links
 
 

1993 births
People from Sergiyev Posad
Living people
Russian footballers
Russia youth international footballers
FC Chernomorets Novorossiysk players
FC Khimki players
FC Saturn Ramenskoye players
FC Lokomotiv Moscow players
FC Armavir players
FC Urartu players
Association football forwards
Russian expatriate footballers
Expatriate footballers in Armenia
Sportspeople from Moscow Oblast